Speedy is the name of two DC Comics superheroes that have each served as teenaged sidekicks for the Green Arrow.

Fictional character biographies

Roy Harper

The original Speedy's real name was Roy Harper Jr.. He first appeared in More Fun Comics #73 (November 1941), where he was identified as the orphaned son of Roy Harper Sr., a forest ranger who had died saving a Navajo medicine chief named "Brave Bow" from a fire. Brave Bow raised the younger Roy himself, training him at archery. Roy Jr. took to this training eagerly, and idolized the archer superhero, Green Arrow. As a teenager, Roy is given the opportunity to perform at an archery competition judged by Green Arrow, where he assists the hero at foiling an attempted burglary, even proving himself to be a faster shot than the hero. Following the death of Brave Bow, Green Arrow asked Roy to serve as his sidekick, an offer Roy readily accepted, taking the name Speedy. Harper became the ward of Green Arrow's alter ego, billionaire Oliver Queen.

There was a second later origin in Adventure Comics #209 (Feb 1955, The Origin of Speedy). His parents (John and Anna) were both killed when an experiment by his scientist father exploded. This was in the wilds of Arizona and Roy was found by Indians and brought up by Chief Thunderhead, a great archer who could do many fantastic things with a bow and arrow, who trained the boy in their use. Later he told Roy to seek his future with the great archer, Green Arrow. The Chief is now dead.

Harper also became an early member of the Teen Titans. After the original Titans disbanded, he joined a band called Great Frog and became a drug addict, a first in DC comics, in an award-winning story in Green Lantern #85-86 (Sept. & November 1971), part of a classic, 14-issue run by the writer-artist team of Denny O'Neil and Neal Adams. Roy spent some time in the Suicide Squad before returning to the Titans.

He fathered a daughter named Lian by the villainess Cheshire, and eventually took the name Arsenal in New Teen Titans #99 (1993). In Justice League of America #1 (vol 3), he is eventually referred to as Red Arrow. After his daughter is killed, and he has one of his arms cut off by the villain Prometheus in Justice League: Cry for Justice, Roy starred in the mini-series Justice League: The Rise of Arsenal during which he retook the name of "Arsenal".

Mia Dearden

Mia Dearden was introduced in Green Arrow (Vol. 3) #2 in 2001. Mia was a teenaged girl who ran from her home after being abused by her father and fell into child prostitution. Mia was rescued from one of her clients by Oliver Queen, who had just recently returned from the dead. Mia began to secretly train with Connor Hawke in archery and combat. Mia continually petitioned Green Arrow to allow her to serve as his sidekick, but Oliver continually demurred, not wanting to put another youngster at risk. Mia redoubled her efforts and Green Arrow finally allowed her to become the new Speedy. Shortly thereafter, she joined the Teen Titans. She has since left the team.

Powers and abilities
Speedy (like their mentor) has a wide variety of trick arrows, most famously his punching glove arrow which is capable of knocking out villains. Speedy also has several other arrows ranging from sleeping gas arrows, exploding arrows, and regular arrows. Roy Harper got his superhero name Speedy by being able to shoot more arrows quicker than the Green Arrow. His speed and accuracy of his arrows was recognized by the Green Arrow while training with him. Speedy's name is often confused with Kid Flash's superhero name; bystanders would mistakenly call Kid Flash "Speedy".

Along with his excellent archery skills, Speedy has mastered several different types of hand-to-hand combat including judo, kickboxing, and karate.

As Arsenal, Roy Harper displayed proficiency with a greater range of weapons, such as guns, truncheons, and boomerangs. He also became a master of Moo Gi Gong, allowing him to use virtually any handheld object as a makeshift weapon.

Roy Harper can speak Japanese and can understand Russian.

Other versions

Speedy of Earth-Two
There was an Earth-Two version of Speedy who was a member of the Seven Soldiers of Victory and All-Star Squadron in the 1940s along with his mentor Green Arrow. Aside from their origin, having been trained on a mesa top together, their history nearly parallels the history of the Earth-One version up until the point when Speedy and Green Arrow, along with their teammates, were thrown into various periods of time during a battle with the Nebula Man. He and his teammates were later retrieved by the Justice Society and the Justice League in order to assist them in saving Earth-Two from the machinations of their old foe the Iron Hand. Speedy had been sent to the island of Circe in the past and turned into a centaur controlled by Circe, but was restored. Years after returning to the present, Speedy came out of retirement, along with his mentor who died during the Crisis on Infinite Earths. This Speedy and his Green Arrow were retroactively wiped from existence by the events of the Crisis on Infinite Earths.

Bizarro World
A Bizarro version of Roy Harper as Arsenal appears as one of the heroes of Bizarro World. In addition to sporting a robotic left arm (as opposed to his right one), the Bizarro Arsenal is shown wearing a quiver filled with dead cats, which he uses as weapons.

Flashpoint
In the alternate timeline of the Flashpoint event, Roy Harper is a member of mercenary squad working for industrialist Oliver Queen. Very early in the story, however, Roy and his fellow mercenaries were killed by an unshown explosion set off by Vixen and a group of anti-Queen activists. The explosion actually kills everyone in the facility save for Vixen and Oliver Queen, who is remarkably unscathed even though he had been standing right next to Roy, discussing the possibility of becoming a group of actual heroes rather than mercenaries, at the time the explosion went off.

Titans Tomorrow
In the Titans Tomorrow future, Roy Harper took on the role of Green Arrow and was killed in battle.

Thrillkiller
Batman: Thrillkiller is an Elseworlds story set in the early 1960s. Roy Harper is depicted as a biker who buys drugs in order to get friendly with schoolgirl Hayley Fitzpatrick (aka Harley Quinn), but a terrifying ordeal with drug runners leads him to alert the police after being helped by Batman and Black Canary. He is later shown practicing archery, though it is not clear if it is part of a rehab scheme or training for vigilantism.

Convergence
During the Convergence event, the New Earth version of Roy Harper is shown following the events of the Titans series. Still struggling with Lian's death, he has now devoted himself to helping the community to make amends for his time with Deathstroke. When the Extremists attack the city, he dons his Arsenal costume and helps his former teammates from the Teen Titans fight off the villains. Dreamslayer then uses his powers to pull Lian out of the timestream shortly before her death and offers to return her to Roy in exchange for him turning on the Titans. Using trickery, Roy pretends to betray his friends, but instead scrambles Dreamslayer's teleportation field. As the Extremists retreat, Roy stays behind with Lian, finally reunited with his daughter.

Teen Titans Go!
Speedy has also made eight appearances in the comic book series Teen Titans Go! (based on the cartoon). His first appearance in issue #10 was a cameo. He made a reappearance with the rest of Titans East in #20 and 25. A super-deformed version of him posed as Cupid in #27. One of the two stories in issue #30 focuses on him and Aqualad. Thus far, he and Aqualad both have made appearances in each tenth issue. He appeared in issue #39 and after being struck by Larry's arrows falls in love with Cheshire, similar to the comics. In issue #48 he appeared as Arsenal in alternate reality in a group called the Teen Tyrants.

Arrow
In the Arrow tie-in comic, Season 2.5, Roy Harper as Arsenal goes with Oliver on mission to stop "drug plane". While Oliver puts an autopilot device on plane's controls and kicks other enemies, one of the thugs fires on Roy and begins falling from the plane, but Oliver managed to rescue him and is put in hospital. While recovering, Felicity is kidnapped by Church of Blood and mercenary group Renegades. Oliver calls Roy for help and gives him kevlar-lined suit after he recovered from injury. Heading to the Church's base of operations, they are contacted by Clinton Hogue, a Church's new leader, who demands Oliver in exchange for Felicity, which Oliver accepts despite Roy's advice not to. Roy goes to Lyla Michaels for help and they, along with another backup released from prison named Huntress, go to Bludhaven where Felicity is held. Infiltrating their base, Roy fights against Cyrus Vanch and Winnick Norton, but after taking them down, he is knocked out by Lyle Bolton electrocuting them and taking the hostages, only to be knocked out by Helena who saves them. Roy and his friends bound the mercenaries and leave for helicopter piloted by Oliver. However, Hogue comes in helipack and attempts to kill Roy. In the middle of the air, the two are knocked out of the plane, held by Roy and Hogue attached to his leg. Roy kicks him and Hogue falls to the ground to his death.

In other media

Television

Smallville
Speedy (Mia Dearden) appeared in the Smallville episode "Crossfire". This Speedy is the Smallville version of Green Arrow's apprentice, Mia Dearden, played by Elise Gatien. She is a prostitute who has trained herself in street-fighting and is attempting to raise enough money to get away from her pimp, Rick. Oliver Queen sees her as a kindred spirit and takes her in to train her while teaching her how to overcome her anger. Rick forces her to lure Oliver to a remote location so he can kidnap him, but Mia turns against him. Rick is arrested, and Mia continues to partner with Oliver. In "Disciple" she is kidnapped by villainous archer named Vordigan, but is rescued by Oliver and Clark and discovers that Oliver is Green Arrow, becoming his disciple. Mia wears red and yellow clothing, which represents the colors of Speedy's costume in the comics. Unlike the comics, Mia is a brunette and is only seen with blonde hair when wearing a wig as a prostitute. The character appears in the comic book continuation Season 11 and prominently in the miniseries like Smallville: Titans and briefly in Smallville: Harbinger.

Arrowverse
In The CW's Arrow, Oliver Queen's sister, Thea Dearden Queen (Willa Holland) is nicknamed "Speedy" by Oliver (Stephen Amell). Thea starts off as a party lover who is often criticized by Oliver for her actions, and she even winds up in a car accident and is forced to do community service with Laurel Lance (Katie Cassidy). She meets Roy Harper (Colton Haynes), a thief, when he steals her bag but becomes attracted to him and eventually starts dating him. In season two, she is still with Roy and runs Oliver's club while being excluded with everyone keeping secrets from her. She later learns that Malcolm Merlyn, the first season's main villain, is her biological father. Thea finds out all of these secrets, except for Oliver's. In the season finale, when she is attacked by Deathstroke/Slade Wilson's minions, Malcolm returns to save her and convinces her to leave Starling City with him. In season three, Oliver reveals to her that he is the Arrow and begins training her.
Colton Haynes appears as Roy Harper / Arsenal on the series as a love interest for Thea. Roy is at one point seeking the "Vigilante", but by the end of the first season has had little success. In season two, Roy has come to the attention of the Hood whilst trying to emulate the vigilante's successes in combating crime in Starling City. The Hood employs Roy to act as his intelligence man on the ground in the Glades. After the Hood shoots an arrow through Roy's leg to prevent him investigating the Mirakuru serum being used in Starling City, Roy continues investigating and is subsequently kidnapped and injected with the same serum by Brother Blood. Unable to control his new-found physical powers, Roy nearly kills a man. After finding this out, the Arrow successfully offers to train him. Eventually the Arrow is forced to reveal his identity as Oliver Queen, Thea's older brother, to Roy in an attempt to get him to help stop a second undertaking. The Arrow refers to Roy as "Speedy" when out fighting crime as a way to remind him of Thea and their love, and to control his powers. Roy loses control and goes on a rampage through the city and even kills a man until Oliver manages to get him sedated. After he is sedated for weeks Oliver eventually finds a cure and injects him with it which cancels out the Mirakuru effects. Roy later meets up with Thea and promises that they will leave Starling together forever but first takes part in the attack against Slade Wilson's army and finally donning a red mask and red arrow. In the third season, Oliver suggests the name Arsenal, which Roy uses in future episodes.
In the season three episode "Public Enemy", when Captain Lance issues an arrest warrant for the Arrow, who he knows is Oliver Queen, Roy dresses up and claims that he is the Arrow, in order to save Oliver. In the following episode, "Broken Arrow", Roy fakes his death, but is unable to tell Thea before leaving Starling City. Thea later locates Roy, who hands her his Arsenal jacket, before leaving. In the season finale, Thea dons the red outfit, becoming the vigilante Speedy.
Speedy is mentioned in the Supergirl episode "Worlds Finest" when Lucy Lane suggests calling Barry Allen "Speedy".

Stargirl
In the Stargirl episode, "Brainwave", Pat Dugan shows the titular character a photo of him and the Star-Spangled Kid with Seven Soldiers of Victory members Green Arrow, Speedy, Vigilante, Shining Knight, Crimson Avenger, and Wing.

Animation
Roy Harper / Speedy appears in the "Teen Titans" segment of The Superman/Aquaman Hour of Adventure, voiced by Pat Harrington, Jr.
Roy Harper / Speedy appears in Teen Titans, voiced by Mike Erwin. Following a minor appearance in the episode "Winner Take All", in which he displays a serious, businesslike attitude, he goes on to join the Teen Titans' sister group Titans East in their self-titled two-part episode, displaying his traditional "bad boy" personality.
Roy Harper / Speedy appears in the Justice League Unlimited episode "Patriot Act", voiced again by Mike Erwin. This version is Green Arrow's "ex-sidekick" and a member of the Justice League.
Roy Harper / Speedy appears in Batman: The Brave and the Bold, voiced primarily by Jason Marsden and by Ryan Ochoa in flashbacks. This version is portrayed as a stereotypical kid sidekick and commonly uses phrases like "Golly!" or "Holy [insert uncommon phrase]".
Roy Harper appears in Young Justice, voiced by Crispin Freeman. Initially starting as Speedy, this version was captured by the Light, who amputated his right arm to make two clones of him and control them through a combination of programming and hypnosis to serve their needs. One clone would become Jim Harper / Guardian, who serves as security for Project Cadmus and operates as a superhero under the belief that he is Roy Harper's uncle, while the second was made to believe he was the real Roy Harper and serve as a sleeper agent inside the Justice League. After becoming Red Arrow, eventually succeeding in joining the League, and learning of his true nature, the second Roy married Cheshire and had a daughter, Lian Nguyen-Harper, all while spending the next five years searching for the real Roy, causing his health and friendships to decline. Upon finding and freeing him, the real Roy seeks revenge on Light member Lex Luthor, who gives him a bionic arm. Choosing not to pursue revenge against Luthor, Roy takes the name Arsenal and briefly joins the Team before being ousted for his recklessness and disobedience while the second Roy retires from being a superhero to focus on being a father. As of Young Justice: Outsiders, the second Roy has renamed himself Will Harper and started a company called Bowhunter Security to support his family. Additionally, the Harpers have begun seeing each other like family and developed a team dynamic.
Roy Harper / Speedy appears in Teen Titans Go! (2013), voiced by Scott Menville.

Film
The Roy Harper version of Speedy appeared in Teen Titans: The Judas Contract, voiced again by Crispin Freeman. Along with Bumblebee and Kid Flash, he was seen in a flashback of how the Teen Titans first met.
Speedy briefly appears in Justice League Dark: Apokolips War, as one of the Titans killed by Parademons in a flashback.

Video games
The Roy Harper version of Red Arrow makes a cameo appearance in Green Arrow's ending in Injustice: Gods Among Us.
The Arrow version of Roy Harper appears as a playable character via DLC content in Lego Batman 3: Beyond Gotham.
Two variations of the Arsenal costume appear as alternate skins for Green Arrow in Injustice 2.
Roy Harper appears as a playable character in Lego DC Super-Villains, voiced again by Crispin Freeman.

References

Characters created by George Papp
Characters created by Mort Weisinger
DC Comics sidekicks
DC Comics code names
Comics characters introduced in 1941
DC Comics martial artists
DC Comics superheroes
Fictional archers
Fictional detectives
Green Arrow characters
Teenage superheroes
Vigilante characters in comics